The Argentinian coral snake (Micrurus pyrrhocryptus) is a species of coral snake in the family Elapidae.

It is found in South America, particularly the Dry Chaco.

References

pyrrhocryptus
Snakes of South America
Reptiles of Argentina
Reptiles of Bolivia
Reptiles of Brazil
Reptiles of Paraguay
Reptiles described in 1862